Sohan Singh Basi is an Indian politician. He was elected to the Lok Sabha, lower house of the Parliament of India as a member of the  Shiromani Akali Dal.

References

External links
 Official biographical sketch in Parliament of India website

India MPs 1967–1970
Lok Sabha members from Punjab, India
Shiromani Akali Dal politicians
1910 births
Year of death missing